Ragù alla salsiccia (English: "sauce with sausage") is a tomato-based sauce in Italian cuisine. In Italian cuisine, a ragù is a meat-based sauce that is often served with pasta. The primary ingredients in ragù alla salsiccia are tomato purée or chopped tomato and sausage, and additional ingredients used can include onion, shallot, carrot, celery, garlic, olive oil, red wine, rosemary, bay leaf, salt and pepper. Canned chopped tomatoes and canned or bottled marinara sauce can be used to prepare the sauce. The sausage can be crumbled in the sauce's preparation. It may be slow-cooked under low heat for several hours.

See also

 List of Italian dishes
 List of sausage dishes
 List of sauces
 Neapolitan ragù

References

External links
 Ragù alla salsiccia recipe 

Italian sauces